The UTVA-66 is a STOL aircraft, which was produced in the former Yugoslavia. It was developed from the UTVA-60 and first flew 1966.

Description
The aircraft was built for landing on unprepared fields and its STOL characteristics include leading edge fixed slats, flaps and drooping ailerons. The cockpit is equipped with dual flight controls. The right front and rear seats in the older version of the aircraft were able to accommodate two stretchers. The aircraft had floats to land on water, but they could have been exchanged for snow skis.

Operational usage

130 UTVA-66 aircraft were manufactured. The last operational aircraft were withdrawn from military service in 1999.

Subsequently, a number were sold to Canada and the United States of America where they were converted for civilian use as rugged utility aircraft.

Variants

 66AM air ambulance
 66H
 66V
 66 Super STOL
 66A never entered military service

Former military operators

 Bosnian Air Force 

 Croatian Air Force  

Macedonian Air Force  

 Republika Srpska Air Force  
92nd Light Multi role Aircraft Squadron

 Yugoslav Air Force
461st Light Combat Aviation Squadron (1977–1988)
462nd Light Combat Aviation Squadron (1977–1981)
252nd Fighter-Bomber Aviation Squadron (1981–1992)
Letalski center Maribor (Civil operator) (1989-2003)

Aircraft on display
Serbia
 Museum of Aviation (Belgrade) in Belgrade
A number of Utva 66 including Utva 66H are on display.

Specifications (Utva 66)

See also

UTVA 75

References

External links

General characteristics for Utva-66

66
1960s Yugoslav military trainer aircraft
Single-engined tractor aircraft
Aircraft first flown in 1966
Glider tugs
STOL aircraft
High-wing aircraft